William Ahern (1861 – November 7, 1916) was a sailor in the United States Navy who received the Medal of Honor for valor during an engineering crisis that threatened his ship.

Biography
Ahern was born in Ireland in 1861 and entered the Navy in New York. Ahern entered the fire room with his face and arms wrapped in wet cloths, crawling over the other boilers to close a valve disconnecting the boiler from the remaining boilers, preventing further damage.

Medal of Honor citation
Rank and organization: Watertender, U.S. Navy. Born: 1861, Ireland. Accredited to: New York. G.O. No.: 482, November 1, 1897.

Citation:

On board the U.S.S. Puritan at the time of the collapse of one of the crown sheets of boiler E of that vessel, 1 July 1897. Wrapped in wet cloths to protect his face and arms, Ahern entered the fireroom, crawled over the tops of the boilers and closed the auxiliary stop valve, disconnecting boiler E and removing the danger of disabling the other boilers.

William O'Hearn
In newspaper reports his name is given as "William O'Hearn": Chicago Tribune June 3, 1898; Oakland Tribune May 20, 1898; New York Times February 6, 1898.

References

1861 births
1916 deaths
Irish emigrants to the United States (before 1923)
Irish sailors in the United States Navy
Irish-born Medal of Honor recipients
Non-combat recipients of the Medal of Honor
United States Navy sailors
United States Navy Medal of Honor recipients